I Am a Killer: Released is a 2020 streaming television series that follows Dale Wayne Sigler, a convicted murderer, trying to adjust to a life outside prison.

Plot Summary 
The series revolves around 53-year old Dale Wayne Sigler; he killed John Zeltner, a Subway employee, in Arlington, Texas in April 1990. He was sentenced to death in 1991, but his death sentence was changed to life three years later because his lawyers argued that he should be retroactively considered under the then-new jury selection rules. Under Texas law, he became eligible for parole after 30 years.

Cast 
 Dale Wayne Sigler

Episodes

Release 
I Am a Killer: Released was released in the US on 28 August 2020, on Netflix. The dates above refer to the original UK release dates on the Sky network.

References

External links 
 
 

True crime television series
Documentary television series about crime in the United States
English-language Netflix original programming
Netflix original documentary television series